Stan Kutcher  is a Canadian Senator and Professor Emeritus of Psychiatry at Dalhousie University. He was appointed to the Senate of Canada on December 12, 2018.

Before his appointment, Dr. Kutcher was Department Head of Psychiatry at Dalhousie University, as well as Associate Dean of International Health, and where he held the Sun Life Financial Chair in Adolescent Mental Health. He is a fellow of the Canadian Academy of Health Sciences and a Distinguished Fellow of the Canadian Psychiatric Association. He was awarded the Order of Nova Scotia in 2014.

Early life and education 
Kutcher is a first generation Canadian born to Ukrainian refugees; his parents survived World War II and made a new life for themselves and their families in Canada. He credits his early life, particularly growing up in a household where community service to others was the norm, as full of the experiences that helped mould his values of civic engagement, that now inform his activities as a Senator.[x] As a young person, he worked with youth living in financially challenged circumstances in Hamilton, Ontario and with incarcerated young people in Ontario's juvenile justice system and as a labourer-teacher with Frontier College.

Kutcher obtained his bachelor's degree in history and political science and his master's degree in history at McMaster University and his medical degree at McMaster University Medical School.[vi] His postgraduate training in psychiatry was at the University of Toronto and he completed a McLaughlin Fellowship at the Medical Research Council Brain Metabolism Unit in Edinburgh.[vii] He is internationally known for his clinical research, policy, and educational work in youth mental health.

He is married to Jan Sheppard Kutcher. They have three adult children and seven grandchildren.

He was a board member of the Art Gallery of Nova Scotia.

Academic career 
Kutcher has made contributions to Canadian and international research regarding the causes and treatment of mental illness in young people, particularly Bipolar Disorder and Major Depressive Disorder.

He developed youth mental health research, education, treatment and community intervention programs at Sunnybrook Health Sciences Centre in Toronto.[i]

As a professor of psychiatry at Dalhousie University, he helped establish the Brain Repair Centre and the Life Sciences Development Association. He was Director of the World Health Organization Collaborating Centre in Mental Health Policy and Training and participated in numerous mental health initiatives led by the Pan American Health Organization, including mental health training, policy development and post-disaster mental health interventions. He co-chaired the Minister of Health's Advisory Panel on Innovation in Mental Health and Addictions in Nova Scotia.

Much of his work has focused on improving mental health care in primary care in Canada and around the world.[iii] His work in Canada and globally has included mental health interventions such as the online mental health knowledge translation resource for educators, primary health care providers, youth and parents – TeenMentalHealth.org, as well as the program An Integrated Approach to Addressing the Issue of Youth Depression which combines youth focused radio programs with teacher and student mental health literacy and clinical mental health care capacity building in Malawi and Tanzania.[iv] He led the development and deployment of novel mental health competency training programs in Canada, the Caribbean and Latin America. Some of his clinical tools, such as the Kutcher Adolescent Depression Scale have been validated and translated into numerous languages.[v][vi]

It was at Dalhousie University that he established the first International Health program in the Faculty of Medicine and the first Global Psychiatry training program in Canada.[vii]

Kutcher has created and led numerous school-based mental health literacy programs helping young people and educators better understand mental health and mental illness. For example, the Curriculum  Guide Resource, designed for application in grades 7-10, is now researched and used across Canada and globally.  The Transitions post-secondary schooling resource is used in Canada and being researched and applied in many other countries.  He led the development of Teachmentalhealth, a pre-service/in-service teacher curriculum, in collaboration with the Faculties of Education at University of British Columbia, Western University and St. Francis Xavier University.

As a member of the Child and Youth Mental Health Committee of the Mental Health Commission of Canada, Kutcher led the development of a national child and adolescent mental health policy framework known as Evergreen.[viii] Kutcher's academic portfolio includes over 400 published papers and numerous books on topics ranging from psychopharmacology to suicide prevention, adolescent brain development and Global School Mental Health.[ix] He has taught and mentored hundreds of medical students as well as individuals pursuing Masters and PhD degrees, in and outside of Canada.[vi] He has served as a mental health advisor to organizations and governments in Canada and internationally.[vi]

He has led and collaborated in scientific research in Canada, the United States, United Kingdom, European Union, the Caribbean, Latin America, Africa and China.[iv] He has served as a founding board member of the Institute of Neuroscience, Mental Health and Addictions of the Canadian Institutes of Health Research, as well as on numerous other research boards and scientific advisory committees and consultancies in Canada and internationally.[vi]

He has been a visiting scholar at 14 institutions in eight countries.

Controversies 
Kutcher was one of the authors of the controversial Study 329 clinical trial which took place between 1994 to 1998 studying the efficacy of paroxetine, an SSRI anti-depressant, in treating 12 to 18-year-olds diagnosed with major depressive disorder.[xi] Study 329 became controversial when it was discovered that the article had been ghostwritten by a PR firm hired by SmithKline Beecham, had made inappropriate claims about the drug's efficacy, and had downplayed safety concerns.[xi][xii][xiii]

Political career 
During the 2011 Canadian federal election, Stan Kutcher was a candidate for the Liberal Party in the Halifax electoral district .

Stan Kutcher was appointed to the Senate of Canada on December 12, 2018.

Awards and Distinctions

Electoral record

See also

External links 
 https://www.mhinnovation.net/organisations/teenmentalhealthorg 
 http://teenmentalhealth.org/ 
 Healthy Minds, Resilient Communities Video 
 Addressing Mental Health Over the Airwaves and in the Classroom Video
 The Challenges of Addressing Mental Health in Developing Countries Video
 https://www.teachmentalhealth.org/ 
 https://pdce.educ.ubc.ca/teach-mental-health-literacy/

Selected books 
 School Mental Health: Global Challenges and Opportunities. Cambridge University Press, Cambridge, New York. (2015)
 Adolescent Brain Development. Colloquium Series on the Developing Brain. (2014)
 Suicide Risk Management: A Manual for Health Professionals. Second Edition. Wiley-Blackwell, UK. (2012)
 Practical Child and Adolescent Psychopharmacology. Cambridge University Press, Cambridge Uk. (2002)
 Child and Adolescent Psychopharmacology. W.B. Saunders. Philadelphia, USA. (1997)

Notes and references

References to be reformatted 
[i] “The Honourable Stan Kutcher.” (Apr. 25, 2019). Making Waves. https://makingwaves.community/the-honourable-stan-kutcher/
[i] “The Naomi Rae Grant Award.” The Canadian Academy of Child and Adolescent Psychiatry. Retrieved on January 10, 2019. https://www.cacap-acpea.org/explore/awards/
[i] “Identification, Diagnosis and Treatment of Adolescent Depression: A Package for First Contact Health Care Providers.” Pan American Health Organization. Retrieved on January 10, 2020. https://www.paho.org/hq/index.php?option=com_content&view=article&id=7434:2007-identification-adolescent-depression-first-contact-health-care-providers&Itemid=40615&lang=en

[ii] “Government Responds to Mental Health Panel Recommendations.” https://novascotia.ca/news/release/?id=20170320002

[iii] “About Dr. Stan Kutcher.” Mental Health Academy. Retrieved on January 10, 2020. https://www.mentalhealthacademy.ca/dr-stan-kutcher

[iv] “An Integrated Approach to Addressing the Issue of Youth Depression.” The Mental Health Innovation Network. Retrieved on January 10, 2020. https://www.mhinnovation.net/innovations/integrated-approach-addressing-issue-youth-depression

[v] Kutcher, S., Chehil, S., Cash, C., & Millar, J. (2005). A competencies-based mental health training model for health professionals in low and middle income countries. World Psychiatry Journal, 4, 177–180.

[vi] Kutcher, S., Chehil, S., & Roberts, T. (2005). Meeting post-disaster mental health needs through an integrated health care provider training program: A pilot project in Grenada post hurricane Ivan. Pan American Journal of Public Health, 18 (4-5), 338–345.

[vii] “Dr. Stanley P. Kutcher Curriculum Vitae.” Dalhousie University. Retrieved on January 10, 2020. https://cdn.dal.ca/content/dam/dalhousie/pdf/faculty/medicine/departments/department-sites/psychiatry/KutcherS-CV.pdf

[viii] “Evergreen: A Child and Youth Mental Health Framework for Canada.” Mental Health Commission of Canada. Retrieved on January 10, 2020. https://www.mentalhealthcommission.ca/sites/default/files/C%252526Y_Evergreen_Framework_ENG_1.pdf

[ix] “Stan Kutcher”. Research Gate. Retrieved on January 10, 2020. https://www.researchgate.net/profile/Stan_Kutcher
[i] “Biography: Senator Stan Kutcher.” Senate of Canada. Retrieved January 10, 2020. https://sencanada.ca/en/senators/kutcher-stan/

[x] Benjamin, Graeme. (2018). “N.S. adolescent mental-health expert Dr. Stan Kutcher appointed to Canadian Senate. Global News. www.globalnews.ca/news/4755050/dr-stan-kutcher-appointed-to-senate/ .

[xi] Doshi, Peter (16 September 2015). "No correction, no retraction, no apology, no comment: paroxetine trial reanalysis raises questions about institutional responsibility", BMJ, 351. doi:10.1136/bmj.h4629

[xii] McGoey, Linsey; Jackson, Emily (February 2009). "Seroxat and the suppression of clinical trial data: regulatory failure and the uses of legal ambiguity", Journal of Medical Ethics, 35(2), pp. 107–112. doi:10.1136/jme.2008.025361  JSTOR 27720271

[xiii] Godlee, Fiona (17 September 2015). "Study 329", BMJ, 351, 17 September 2015. doi:10.1136/bmj.h4973

Living people
Canadian psychiatrists
Canadian senators from Nova Scotia
21st-century Canadian politicians
Independent Canadian senators
Nova Scotia candidates for Member of Parliament
Candidates in the 2011 Canadian federal election
Liberal Party of Canada candidates for the Canadian House of Commons
1951 births